Litang is a town in Binyang County, Guangxi Autonomous Region, China. , it has 9 residential communities and 14 villages under its administration. It is a railway junction for the Hunan–Guangxi, Litang–Zhanjiang and Litang–Qinzhou Railways.

References

Towns of Guangxi
Binyang County